Rodrigo Fagundes Freitas (born 10 Match 1987), known as Rodrigo Fagundes or simply Rodrigo is a Brazilian footballer who currently plays as a defender for Criciúma.

Career statistics

Club

Notes

References

1987 births
Living people
Brazilian footballers
Association football defenders
Campeonato Brasileiro Série B players
Campeonato Brasileiro Série C players
Campeonato Brasileiro Série D players
Esporte Clube Santo André players